The Unknown War is a military history book written by Hienadz Sahanovich. It describes the events of the war between Tsardom of Russia and the Polish–Lithuanian Commonwealth in 1654-67. The war has become known as a part of the "Deluge", a series of military conflicts that overwhelmed the Polish–Lithuanian Commonwealth in the middle of the 17th century which included the Khmelnytsky Uprising, the Swedish invasion, and the Russian invasion among others.

Importance
The book became one of the first in-depth researches of military actions during the Russo-Polish War (1654–67) which took place in the lands of the modern-day Belarus. The topic of armed conflicts between Russia and historical predecessors of the former Soviet Republics was largely forbidden in the times of the Soviet Union (this explains the book title). The book was released in 1995, four years after disintegration of the ex-USSR.

The Unknown War focuses on war events in the Grand Duchy of Lithuania, one of two integral parts of the Polish–Lithuanian Commonwealth (often generalized under the name of Poland). The dominant portion of lands that made up the Grand Duchy in the 17th century are today united in the Republic of Belarus, and hence, create a subject of historic analysis for Belarusian historians like Hienadz Sahanovich.

The book describes the following historical figures among others:
 Janusz Radziwill, Great Hetman of Lithuania
 Boguslaw Radziwill, Governor of the Duchy of Prussia
 Pawel Jan Sapieha, Great Hetman of Lithuania
 Tsar Alexis of Russia
 John II Casimir Vasa, King of the Polish–Lithuanian Commonwealth
 George II Rakoczi, Prince of Transylvania
 Magnus De la Gardie, Swedish governor of occupied territories
 Philip Abukhovich, Voivode of Smolensk
 Denis Murashka, commander of Belarusian (Lithuanian) guerrillas
 Wincenty Gosiewski, Field Hetman of Lithuania
 Ivan Khovansky, duke and voivode in the Russian army
 Alexei Trubeskoy, duke and voivode in the Russian army

Controversy
The book is sometimes criticized for putting excessive blame for casualties among the population of the Grand Duchy of Lithuania on hostilities committed by the Russian army (which operated in alliance with the Ukrainian Cossacks for the most time of the war). For example, the book says that population loss on the Belarusian lands exceeded 50% (for comparison, population loss during World War II in Belarus, one of the world worst hit territories, was about 25%).

However, these numbers do not differentiate between people who died as a result of military action, and victims of the Black Death which ran through Europe at about that time. Proponents of the book usually respond that the Black Death had a minimal effect of the Polish–Lithuanian Commonwealth in the 17th century.

Another argument against the data used in the book tables is that they often refer to the period between 1648 and 1667, and thus additionally account for population loss caused by the Khmelnytsky Uprising of 1648-1654 and not associated with the Russian invasion.

Example of a table from the book:

* The table is based on the data provided by Vasil Mialeshka

Chapters

The book consists of the following chapters:

 Preface
 The Eve Of War
 Invasion
 Under The Rule Of "Liberators"
 The Last Campaign Of Radziwill
 "The Sovereign Foray" of 1655
 Around The Truce of Vilno
 Occupiers And Guerrillas
 Breakthrough
 Wasted Chances
 Andrusovo
 "To Oblivion And Forgetfulness"?
 Zusamenfassung
 Sources And Researches
 Addition
 Demographic Tables
 Biographies

The author

Hienadz Sahanovic (sometimes spelled as Gienadz Saganovich) is a Belarusian historian specialized in research of the Belarusian Middle Ages, history of the Grand Duchy of Lithuania. He is also known for his books Defending His Motherland. Kanstantin Astrozhski and Ten Centuries Of The Belarusian History (co-written with Uladzimir Arlow).

References

Books about military history
History books about the Polish–Lithuanian Commonwealth
History books about the Tsardom of Russia
Non-fiction books about war
20th-century history books
1995 non-fiction books